EPS TPP Kosovo is a Serbian thermal power station management company with headquarters in Obilić, Kosovo.

History
EPS TPP Kosovo was founded by Elektroprivreda Srbije (EPS) on 23 December 1991.

Following the Kosovo War and NATO bombing of Yugoslavia in 1999, the UNMIK administration was established in Kosovo on 1 July 1999, and Elektroprivreda Srbije lost its access to the local coal mines and power plants, including Kosovo A and Kosovo B power plants, which were under jurisdiction of EPS TPP Kosovo.

Since then, government-owned Elektroprivreda Srbija by political decision continued to pay off earnings to all of Kosovo-based EPS companies, including EPS TPP Kosovo employees (the other two EPS companies based on Kosovo are EPS Surface Mining Kosovo and EPS Elektrokosmet). However, all these employees are not working in Kosovo-based power plants, and are only occasionally and indirectly employed by EPS throughout the rest of Serbia. As of May 2009, there was a total of around 7,000 such employees which were working only on paper and receive regular earnings. As of June 2017, that number was cut to 4,539 employees.

Gallery

See also
 Elektroprivreda Srbije
 EPS Surface Mining Kosovo
 EPS Elektrokosmet
 Electrical energy in Kosovo

Notes

References

External links
 Official website

1991 establishments in Kosovo
Coal-fired power stations in Serbia
Electric power companies of Serbia
Elektroprivreda Srbije
Energy companies established in 1991
Government-owned companies of Serbia